Brereton is an unincorporated community in Fulton County, Illinois, United States. Brereton is located on Illinois Route 78, north of Canton.

References

Unincorporated communities in Fulton County, Illinois
Unincorporated communities in Illinois